Pramatha Nath Bishi (11 June 1901 – 10 May 1985) was an Indian writer, educationist, and parliamentarian from West Bengal. He was a member of the West Bengal Legislative Council (1962–1968) and a nominated member of the Rajya Sabha from 1972 to 1978.

Early life and education
Bishi was born on 11 June 1901 at Joari in Rajshahi, the son of Nalininath Bishi and Sarojbasini Devi. He studied for seventeen years at Brahma Vidyalaya in Santiniketan, where he became closely acquainted with Rabindranath Tagore. He passed the matriculation (1919) from Santiniketan and took a break of several years before going on to complete the IA (1927) and BA with honours in English from Rajshahi College (1929). He then took an MA in Bangla (1932) from Calcutta University, standing first class first. He carried on research on a Ramtanu Lahiri Research Fellowship (1933-1936).

Career
He joined Ripon College (1936–1946) and then Calcutta University (1950) as professor of Bangla. He was Rabindra Professor and Head of the Department of Bangla, Calcutta University (1963–66). He also worked as editor of the Santiniketan (1931) and assistant editor of Anandabazar Patrika (1946–1949). He retired in 1971. He was also a member of West Bengal Bidhan Sabha (1962).

Writing
Bishi was a prolific writer in several genres: poetry, satire, short story, novel, drama, essay and criticism. He wrote under various pseudonyms, such as Pranabi, Kamalakanta, Haturi, Bishnu Sharma, Amit Ray, Madhabya, Scot Thomson. Among his published novels are Desher Shatru (1924), Padma (1935), Jodadighir Chaudhuri Paribar (1938), Keshabati (1941), Nilmanir Svarga (1954), Sindhudesher Prahari (1955), Carey Saheber Munsi (1958), Lal Kella (1963), Ashvatther Abhishap, Chalan Beel, etc. His books of short stories include Shrikanter Pancham Parba (1944), Galper Mato Galpa (1945), Gali O Galpa (1945), Dakini (1945), Brahmar Hasi (1948), Nilbarna Shrgal (1956), Alaukik (1957), Bichitra Sanglap (1955), Svanirbachita Galpa (1960), etc. His books of poems are Dewali (1923), Basanta Sena O Anyanya Kavita (1927), Bidyasundar (1935), Juktabeni (1948), Shakuntala O Anyanya Kavita (1946), Hangha Mithun (1950), Uttar Megh (1953), Kingshuk Bahni (1959), Shrestha Kavita (1961), etc. His dramas are Rnang Krtta (1935), Ghrtang Pibet (1941), Mauchake Dhil (1945), Government Inspector (1944), Permit (1956), etc. His essays are included in Banglar Lekhak (1950), Jawharlal Nehru- Byakti O Byaktitva (1951), Bangla Sahityer Nara Nari (1953), Kamala Kanter Asar (1955), Nana Rakam (1958), Rabindra Kavya Prabaha, Rabindra Kavya Nirjhar, Rabindranath O Santiniketan, Rabindra Natya Prabaha, Rabindra Bichitra, Rabindra Sarani, etc. He also edited Bhudev Rachana Sambhar, Vidyasagar Rachana Sambhar, etc.

Awards
Bishi was awarded the Rabindra Puraskar (1960), Vidyasagar Smrti Puraskar (1982), Jagattarini Puraskar (1983).

He died in Calcutta on 10 May 1985.

Sources
Brief Biodata

Nominated members of the Rajya Sabha
1901 births
1985 deaths
People from West Bengal
Recipients of the Padma Shri in literature & education
Rajshahi College alumni
University of Calcutta alumni
Writers from Kolkata